Joseph Abu Khalil (1925–2019) was a Lebanese politician from the Kataeb Party. He served in various posts in the party and edited its official newspaper, Al Amal, for a long time.

Biography
Being a native of Beit ed-Dine, Mount Lebanon, Abu Khalil was born in 1925. He was a Maronite. He was one of the close allies of the Kataeb Party leadership, namely Gemayel family members, including Pierre Gemayel and his son Bashir Gemayel. At the beginning of the 2000s Abu Khalil was an advisor to Amine Gemayel, the eldest son of Pierre Gemayel. Within the Kataeb party he held several posts. Abu Khalil was political secretary of the party in the mid-1970s. He was elected its deputy president in the congress in June 2015 when Samy Gemayel was elected president of Kataeb party.

Abu Khalil was among the founders of a radio station, Voice of Lebanon, in 1958. Next he was named the editor-in-chief of Al Amal newspaper.

Abu Khalil died at age 94 in December 2019.

References

20th-century Lebanese people
1925 births
2019 deaths
Lebanese Maronites
Kataeb Party politicians
Lebanese journalists
People from Mount Lebanon Governorate
Radio founders
20th-century journalists